Harju may refer to:

Geography

Estonia
Harju County, one of 15 counties of Estonia
Harju, Hiiu County, a village in Hiiumaa Parish, Hiiu County.
Pühalepa-Harju, a village in Hiiumaa Parish, Hiiu County, formerly known as Harju.
Harju Plateau, a plateau in northern Estonia, part of Baltic klint. (et)
Harju Bay, a bay in Saaremaa Parish, Saare County
Harju Street, a street in Tallinn old town
Harju Street, a street in Pärnu
Harju Gate, a historical gate in Tallinn old town. (et)

Finland
Harju, Helsinki, a quarter of Helsinki
Harju, Jyväskylä, a district in Jyväskylä
Harju, Valkeala, a village in Valkeala, Southern Finland
Harju train station, a train station in Valkeala

Russia
Harju was the name of Yegorovo, in Vyborgsky District, Leningrad Oblast before 1948

Other uses
Harju (surname)
Harju Elu, local newspaper of Harju County. (et)